Atchima Eng-Chuan (born 10 February 1990) is a Thai sprinter specialising in the 400 metres. She won a bronze medal at the 2017 Asian Indoor and Martial Arts Games. She holds the current national indoor record in the 400 metres.

International competitions

Personal bests

Outdoor
200 metres – 24.73 (+1.0 m/s, Kaohsiung 2011)
400 metres – 55.12 (Rheinau-Freistett 2014)
Indoor
400 metres – 54.45 (Ashgabat 2017) NR

External links

References

1990 births
Living people
Atchima Eng-chuan
Athletes (track and field) at the 2014 Asian Games
Southeast Asian Games medalists in athletics
Atchima Eng-chuan
Atchima Eng-chuan
Competitors at the 2013 Southeast Asian Games
Competitors at the 2015 Southeast Asian Games
Competitors at the 2017 Southeast Asian Games
Atchima Eng-chuan
Competitors at the 2015 Summer Universiade
Competitors at the 2017 Summer Universiade
Atchima Eng-chuan
Atchima Eng-chuan